Gbeogo is a village in northern Ghana. It is situated to the south-east of Bolgatanga, in the Tallensi Traditional Area. Gbeogo is populated by the Tallensi people, and consists mainly of mud-built dwellings.  The village is home to a deaf school and has been host to American Peace Corps Volunteers for decades.  They run the tree nursery, teach in the deaf school and work in the dispensary.

External links
Two reports of a stay in Gbeogo by Marios Cleovoulou, 1998:
How does development affect culture? – an essay
1998 Newsletter – including a description of Gbeogo

Populated places in the Upper East Region